Maloye Bratsevo is a rural locality (a village) in Ilyinskoye Rural Settlement, Kolchuginsky District, Vladimir Oblast, Russia. The population was 5 as of 2010. There are 2 streets.

Geography 
Maloye Bratsevo is located 20 km north of Kolchugino (the district's administrative centre) by road. Bolshoye Bratsevo is the nearest rural locality.

References 

Rural localities in Kolchuginsky District